Tivadar is a village in Szabolcs-Szatmár-Bereg county, in the Northern Great Plain region of eastern Hungary.

Name
Tivadar is a Hungarian version of the name Theodore.

Geography

History 
The name Tivadar first appeared in the papal tithe register in 1333. The XIV. It was already a prosperous settlement in the 16th century, owned by the Gulácsi family.

In 1428 the Petneházi family and in 1435 the Jármi family also owned the settlement. In 1551, Demeter Oroszi also received a share as a royal gift. In 1566, the village was destroyed by the Tartar auxiliaries of the Turks. In 1599, the Transylvanian princely councilor Miklós Zólyomi of Alesi acquired a share of the land by exchange. Between 1600 and 1676 several of its owners were recorded. In 1800, the families of Kölcsei, Szarka, Vincze, Gacsályi and Matolcsi, among others, had a larger estate here.

Economy 

Populated places in Szabolcs-Szatmár-Bereg County